Bernabei is a surname. It may refer to:

Alessandro Bernabei (1580–1630), Italian painter of the late-Renaissance or Mannerist period
Ercole Bernabei (1622–1687), Italian composer and organist
Ettore Bernabei (1921–2016), Italian television director and producer
Joanna Bernabei-McNamee (born 1975), American college basketball coach
Pietro Antonio Bernabei (born 1948), Italian painter
Pier Antonio Bernabei (1570–1630), also known as Della Casa, Italian painter 
Raymond Bernabei (1925–2008), US soccer player
Tommaso Barnabei (sometimes as Tommaso Bernabei), also known as Maso Papacello (c. 1500–1559), Italian painter of the Renaissance

See also
Bernabe (disambiguation)